A souvenir , memento, keepsake, or token of remembrance, is an object a person acquires for the memories the owner associates with it. A souvenir can be any object that can be collected or purchased and transported home by the traveler as a memento of a visit. The object itself may have intrinsic value, or be a symbol of experience. Without the owner's input, the symbolic meaning is lost and cannot be articulated.

As objects 

The tourism industry designates tourism souvenirs as commemorative merchandise associated with a location, often including geographic information and usually produced in a manner that promotes souvenir collecting.

Throughout the world, the souvenir trade is an important part of the tourism industry serving a dual role, first to help improve the local economy, and second to allow visitors to take with them a memento of their visit, ultimately to encourage an opportunity for a return visit, or to promote the locale to other tourists as a form of word-of-mouth marketing. Promotional tchotchke at trade shows serve a similar function.  Perhaps the most collected souvenirs by tourists are self-generated: photographs as a medium to document specific events and places for remembrance. 

Souvenirs as objects include mass-produced merchandise such as clothing: T-shirts and hats; collectables: postcards, refrigerator magnets, key chains, pins, souvenir coins and tokens, miniature bells, models, figurines, statues; household items: spoons, mugs, bowls, plates, ashtrays, egg timers, fudge, notepads, coasters, and many others.

Souvenirs also include non-mass-produced items like folk art, local artisan handicrafts, objects that represent the traditions and culture of the area, non-commercial, natural objects like sand from a beach, and anything else that a person attaches nostalgic value to and collects among his personal belongings.

A more grisly form of souvenir (here as an example of war booty) in the First World War was displayed by a Pathan soldier to an English Territorial. After carefully studying the Tommy's acquisitions (a fragment of shell, a spike and badge from a German helmet), he produced a cord with the ears of enemy soldiers he claimed to have killed. He was keeping them to take back to India for his wife.

As memorabilia 

Similar to souvenirs, memorabilia (Latin for memorable (things), plural of memorābile) are objects treasured for their memories or historical interest; however, unlike souvenirs, memorabilia can be valued for a connection to an event or a particular professional field, company or brand.

Examples include sporting events, historical events, culture, and entertainment. Such items include: clothing; game equipment; publicity photographs and posters; magic memorabilia; other entertainment-related merchandise & memorabilia; movie memorabilia; airline and other transportation-related memorabilia; and pins, among others.

Often memorabilia items are kept in protective covers or display cases to safeguard and preserve their condition.

As gifts 

Bringing back  from trips to co-workers and families is a social obligation, and can be considered a form of apology for the traveller's absence.  sales are big business at Japanese tourist sites. Unlike souvenirs, however,  are frequently special food products, packaged into several small portions to be easily distributed to all the members of a family or a workplace.

Travelers may buy souvenirs as gifts for those who did not make the trip.

In the Philippines a similar tradition of bringing souvenirs as a gift to family members, friends, and coworkers is called .

Gallery

See also 

 Devotional articles
 Charm bracelet
 Gift shop
 Goss crested china
 Heirloom
 Magic mug
 Momento mori
 Miyagegashi – Japanese
 Nostalgia industry
 Railroadiana
 Retail
 List of collectibles

References

External links 

Retailing by products and services sold
Sales
Tourism
Memorabilia